Ahmed Moussa Sidibé (Arabic: احمد موسى سيديبي; born 2 May 1974) is a Mauritanian professional football manager and former player who played as a striker. As of 2021, he is the head coach of Régional 2 club US La Gacilly. During his playing career, he scored five goals in nineteen games for the Mauritania national team.

Notes

References 

1974 births
Living people
People from Nouakchott
Mauritanian footballers
Association football forwards
ACS Ksar players
Angers SCO players
La Vitréenne FC players
GSI Pontivy players
Nîmes Olympique players
Luçon FC players
US Avranches players
Gazélec Ajaccio players
Clermont Foot players
US Saint-Malo players
Mesaimeer SC players
Voltigeurs de Châteaubriant players
Super D1 players
Championnat National 3 players
Championnat National 2 players
Championnat National players
Division d'Honneur players
Qatari Second Division players
Mauritanian football managers
Mauritanian expatriate footballers
Mauritanian expatriate football managers
Expatriate footballers in France
Expatriate footballers in Qatar
Expatriate football managers in France
Mauritanian expatriate sportspeople in France
Mauritanian expatriate sportspeople in Qatar